Frunzyenskaya is a Minsk Metro station. It was opened on December 31, 1990. 

Gallery 

Minsk Metro stations
Railway stations opened in 1990